KSNN (103.7 FM, "103-7 The River") is a radio station licensed to serve Ridgway, Colorado Montrose, Colorado & Delta, Colorado, United States with The Kidd Kraddick Morning Show, middays with Kylah, afternoons with DJ Roberts and nights with Stacy Lynn. The station, established in 2002, is currently owned by Townsquare Media and the broadcast license is held by Townsquare License, LLC.  The Vice-President/General Manager is Tony Driskill.  The Director Of Sales is Phil Jimenez & the Business Manager is Belinda Haddock.

Programming
KSNN broadcasts a contemporary hit radio music format. With programs including Kidd Kraddick in the Morning. In addition to its usual music programming, KSNN also airs the Delta Panthers' high school football games.

History
This station received its original construction permit from the Federal Communications Commission on March 24, 1999. The new station was assigned the KBNG call sign by the FCC on May 10, 1999. KBNG received its license to cover from the FCC on August 19, 2002.

In December 2002, Idaho Broadcasting Consortium, Inc., reached an agreement to sell this station to the Woodland Communications Corporation for $300,000. The deal was approved by the FCC on January 23, 2003, and the transaction was consummated on March 11, 2003.

In July 2004, Woodland Communications Corporation reached an agreement to sell this station to Cherry Creek Radio through their CCR-Montrose IV, LLC, subsidiary as part of a three-station deal valued at a reported $2.65 million. The deal was approved by the FCC on August 19, 2004, and the transaction was consummated on October 5, 2004.

On May 16, 2012, the station changed its call sign to the current KSNN. On May 17, 2012, KSNN changed their format to soft AC, branded as "Sunny 103". In July, 2018, the station changed its format to CHR and rebranded as "103.7 The River"

Previous logo

References

External links
KSNN official website

SNN
Contemporary hit radio stations in the United States
Radio stations established in 2002
Ouray County, Colorado
2002 establishments in Colorado
Townsquare Media radio stations